Ademir da Silva Santos Júnior (born 16 February 1995), simply known as Ademir or Ademir Fumacinha, is a Brazilian footballer who plays as a forward for Atlético Mineiro.

Club career

Early career
Born in São Paulo, Ademir was raised in Patrocínio, Minas Gerais.

In 2016, Ademir signed for Clube Atlético Patrocinense, and helped the side in their back-to-back promotions from the third to the first division of the Campeonato Mineiro. In 2017, he also spent a short period on loan at hometown side Nacional-SP for the year's Copa Paulista.

América Mineiro
On 5 April 2018, after impressing for Patrocinense in the 2018 Campeonato Mineiro, Ademir signed a contract with Série A side América Mineiro until December 2019. He made his top tier debut on 28 May 2018, coming on as a second-half substitute for Aderlan in a 3–1 home loss to São Paulo. 

Ademir scored his first goal in the category on 3 June, netting his team's third in a 3–1 home win against Atlético Paranaense. He contributed with one goal in 14 appearances during his first season, as his side suffered relegation.

Ademir started the 2020 campaign as the club's top goalscorer in the Campeonato Mineiro with five goals, Ademir missed out the first matches of the Série B due to a thigh injury. In October of that year, he renewed his contract until December 2021, and finished the season with eight league goals and a promotion back to the main category.

In 2021, Ademir scored 13 goals in the Série A season, playing a crucial role in América's first ever qualification for the Copa Libertadores.

Atlético Mineiro
On 19 September 2021, Atlético Mineiro's president Sérgio Coelho confirmed that Ademir agreed to a pre-contract with the club, effective as of the following 1 January.

Career statistics

Honours
Patrocinense
Campeonato Mineiro Módulo II: 2017

Atlético Mineiro
Supercopa do Brasil: 2022
Campeonato Mineiro: 2022

References

External links
 

1995 births
Living people
Footballers from São Paulo
Brazilian footballers
Association football forwards
Campeonato Brasileiro Série A players
Campeonato Brasileiro Série B players
Clube Atlético Patrocinense players
Nacional Atlético Clube (SP) players
América Futebol Clube (MG) players
Clube Atlético Mineiro players